Tá Tudo Certo is an upcoming Brazilian romantic-comedy streaming television miniseries for children and adolescents, which is produced by Nonstop and Formata Produções e Conteúdo for the Walt Disney Company. In Latin America, the four-part miniseries will premiere on Disney+.

Plot  
Pedro dreams of becoming a famous musician. By chance he meets the singer and songwriter Ana, who shows him the diversity of life and music. On his journey, Pedro begins to rethink his definition of success and has to grapple with what he wants for his own future.

Cast 
 Pedro Calais as Pedro	
 Ana Caetano as Ana
 Vitão as Vitão
 Toni Garrido as Toni		
 Clara Buarque as Clara
 Julia Mestre as Julia
 Gita Delavy as Gita
 Manu Gavassi as Manu	
 Agnes Nunes as Agnes

Episodes

References

External links 
 

Television shows filmed in Brazil
2020s Brazilian television series
Portuguese-language television shows
Disney+ original programming
Upcoming television series